Live Read is a monthly live staged reading of a film script and a part of the Film Independent at LACMA film series at the Bing Theater directed by Jason Reitman and hosted by Elvis Mitchell from 2011 to 2016. In 2019, Film Independent brought the series back as part of Film Independent Presents... at the Wallis Annenberg Center for the Performing Arts, produced by director of events, Rachel Bleemer. A guest director reads the stage directions in the scripts while images from the film would be projected behind the cast.  The script is typically announced days before the event and while some actors were announced beforehand, full cast lists and the role each actor would play were kept secret until the event itself.  The actors do not rehearse ahead of time.

The readings are one-night-only and are not recorded due to rights issues.  Because of this, tickets for the 500 seats, go on pre-sale to members of Film Independent one week ahead of the general public, and sell out almost immediately.

The series is to show audiences how actors create characters.

Readings
Jason Reitman directs and reads the stage directions unless otherwise noted.  Many of the actors play multiple supporting roles.  Specific roles are stated only when information is known.

2011

October (The Breakfast Club)
The Breakfast Club by John Hughes

Cast

Jennifer Garner as Claire (originally played by Molly Ringwald)
James Van Der Beek as Andy (originally played by Emilio Estevez)
Mindy Kaling as Allison (originally played by Ally Sheedy)
Patton Oswalt as Brian (originally played by Anthony Michael Hall)
Aaron Paul as Bender (originally played by Judd Nelson)
Michael Chiklis as Mr. Vernon (originally played by Paul Gleason)
J. K. Simmons as Carl the janitor (originally played by John Kapelos)

November (The Apartment)
The Apartment by Billy Wilder and I. A. L. Diamond

Cast
Steve Carell as C.C. Baxter (originally played by Jack Lemmon)
Natalie Portman as Fran Kubelik (originally played by Shirley MacLaine)
Pierce Brosnan as Mr. Sheldrake (originally played by Fred MacMurray; J. K. Simmons was originally slated to play this role, couldn't attend the event)
Ken Jeong as Mr. Dobisch (originally played by Ray Walston) and the Rickshaw restaurant waiter
Jake Johnson as Dr. Dreyfuss (originally played by Jack Kruschen)
Nick Kroll as Mr. Kirkeby (originally played by David Lewis)
Collette Wolfe as Sylvia (originally played by Joan Shawlee)
Mindy Kaling as Miss Olsen (originally played by Edie Adams)

December (The Princess Bride)
The Princess Bride by William Goldman, based on the novel by Goldman

Cast
Mindy Kaling as Princess Buttercup (originally played by Robin Wright)
Paul Rudd as Westley (originally played by Cary Elwes)
Cary Elwes as Prince Humperdinck (originally played by Chris Sarandon; Elwes played Westley in the original film)
Nick Kroll as Count Rugen (originally played by Christopher Guest) and the Impressive Clergyman (originally played by Peter Cook)
Goran Višnjić as Inigo Montoya (originally played by Mandy Patinkin)
Bill Fagerbakke as Fezzik (originally played by André the Giant)
Patton Oswalt as Vizzini (originally played by Wallace Shawn)
Kevin Pollak as Miracle Max (originally played by Billy Crystal) and other male roles
Collette Wolfe as Valerie (originally played by Carol Kane) and other female roles
Rob Reiner as the Grandfather (originally played by Peter Falk; Reiner directed the original film)
Fred Savage as the Grandson (originally played by Fred Savage)

2012

January (Shampoo)
Shampoo by Robert Towne and Warren Beatty

Cast
Bradley Cooper as George Roundy (originally played by Warren Beatty)
Olivia Wilde as Jackie (originally played by Julie Christie)
Kate Hudson as Jill (originally played by Hudson's mother, Goldie Hawn)
Diane Lane as Felicia Karpf (originally played by Lee Grant)
J. K. Simmons as Lester Karpf (originally played by Jack Warden)
Nick Kroll as Johnny Pope (originally played by Tony Bill) and others
Patton Oswalt as Norman (originally played by Jay Robinson) and others
Lena Dunham as Lorna Karpf (originally played by Carrie Fisher) and others

February (Reservoir Dogs)
Reservoir Dogs by Quentin Tarantino.  Reitman assembled an all-black cast to play roles originally played on screen by white actors.

Cast
Laurence Fishburne as Larry "Mr. White" Dimmick (originally played by Harvey Keitel)
Cuba Gooding Jr. as Freddy "Mr. Orange" Newandyke (originally played by Tim Roth)
Terrence Howard as Vic "Mr. Blonde" Vega (originally played by Michael Madsen)
Anthony Mackie as Mr. Pink (originally played by Steve Buscemi)
Anthony Anderson as "Nice Guy Eddie" Cabot (originally played by Chris Penn)
Chi McBride as Joe Cabot (originally played by Lawrence Tierney)
Common as Mr. Brown (originally played by Quentin Tarantino) and Officer Marvin Nash (originally played by Kirk Baltz)
Patton Oswalt as K-Billy DJ (originally played by Steven Wright), Officer Holdaway (originally played by Randy Brooks; as Brooks was the only black actor in the original film, Oswalt was the only white actor at the reading), and others

March (The Big Lebowski)
The Big Lebowski by the Coen brothers.  Due to the huge turnout, speakers were set up outside to allow those without tickets limited access to the proceedings.

Cast
Seth Rogen as The Dude (originally played by Jeff Bridges)
Rainn Wilson as Walter Sobchak (originally played by John Goodman)
Hank Azaria as Donny Kerbatsos (originally played by Steve Buscemi), Karl Hungus (originally played by Peter Stormare), Da Fino (originally played by Jon Polito), George Bush, and others
Jason Alexander as the Big Lebowski (originally played by David Huddleston)
Christina Hendricks as Maude Lebowski (originally played by Julianne Moore)
Catherine Reitman as Bunny Lebowski (originally played by Tara Reid) and others
Fred Savage as Brandt (originally played by Philip Seymour Hoffman), Smokey (originally played by Jimmie Dale Gilmore), a nihilist, and others (Savage was a last-minute replacement for Patton Oswalt)
Sam Elliott as The Stranger (originally played by Sam Elliott)
Nick Kroll as Jackie Treehorn (originally played by Ben Gazzara), Jesus Quintana (originally played by John Turturro), a nihilist, and others

April (The Apartment)
The Apartment by Billy Wilder and I. A. L. Diamond at The New York Times Center.  This was the first of the Live Read series to take place outside of Los Angeles

Cast
Paul Rudd as C.C. Baxter (originally played by Jack Lemmon)
Emma Stone as Fran Kubelik (originally played by Shirley MacLaine)
James Woods as Mr. Sheldrake (originally played by Fred MacMurray)
Tom Cavanagh as Mr. Dobisch (originally played by Ray Walston) and the Rickshaw restaurant waiter
David Wain as Dr. Dreyfuss (originally played by Jack Kruschen)
Jason Sudeikis as Mr. Kirkeby (originally played by David Lewis)
Greta Gerwig as Sylvia (originally played by Joan Shawlee; Lena Dunham was originally slated to play this role, but couldn't attend the event)
Carla Buono as Miss Olsen (originally played by Edie Adams)

September (American Beauty)
American Beauty by Alan Ball at the Toronto International Film Festival.

Cast
Bryan Cranston as Lester Burnham (originally played by Kevin Spacey)
Christina Hendricks as Carolyn Burnham (originally played by Annette Bening) and others
Mae Whitman as Jane Burnham (originally played by Thora Birch) and others
Adam Driver as Ricky Fitts (originally played by Wes Bentley)
Sarah Gadon as Angela Hayes (originally played by Mena Suvari) and Barbara Fitts (originally played by Allison Janney)
Nick Kroll as Colonel Frank Fitts (originally played by Chris Cooper) and others
Paul Scheer as Buddy Kane (originally played by Peter Gallagher) and others
George Strombolopoulos as Jim Olmeyer (originally played by Scott Bakula) and others

Woody Harrelson was originally slated to play Colonel Fitts while Nick Kroll would play Buddy Kane, but when Harrelson was stuck in Hawaii, Kroll played Fitts and Paul Scheer played Kane.

October (Bull Durham)
Bull Durham by Ron Shelton

Cast
J. K. Simmons as "Crash" Davis (originally played by Kevin Costner) and Jimmy (originally played by William O'Leary)
Susan Sarandon as Annie Savoy (originally played by Sarandon)
Andy Samberg as "Nuke" LaLoosh (originally played by Tim Robbins)
Ron Shelton as Skip (originally played by Trey Wilson; Shelton wrote and directed the original film)
David Koechner as Larry (originally played by Robert Wuhl)
Johnny Simmons as Bobby (originally played by David Neidorf)
Mae Whitman as Millie (originally played by Jenny Robertson)
Jason Mantzoukas as Teddy (originally played by Garland Bunting)

November (Manhattan)
Manhattan by Woody Allen

Cast
Stephen Merchant as Isaac Davis (originally played by Woody Allen)
Olivia Munn as Mary Wilkie (originally played by Diane Keaton)
Shailene Woodley as Tracy (originally played by Mariel Hemingway)
Fred Savage as Yale Pollack (originally played by Michael Murphy)
Mae Whitman as Emily Pollack (originally played by Anne Byrne)
Erika Christensen as Jill Davis (originally played by Meryl Streep)
Jason Mantzoukas as Dennis (originally played by Michael O'Donoghue)

December (Ghostbusters)
Ghostbusters by Dan Aykroyd and Harold Ramis.  Jason Reitman's father Ivan Reitman directed the original film.

Cast
Seth Rogen as Peter Venkman (originally played by Bill Murray)
Jack Black as Ray Stantz (originally played by Dan Aykroyd)
Rainn Wilson as Egon Spengler (originally played by Harold Ramis)
Phil LaMarr as Winston Zeddemore (originally played by Ernie Hudson)
Kristen Bell as Dana Barrett (originally played by Sigourney Weaver)
Kevin Pollak as Walter Peck (originally played by William Atherton), Larry King, and Casey Kasem
Mae Whitman as Janine Melnitz (originally played by Annie Potts)
Paul Rust as Louis Tully (originally played by Rick Moranis)
Paul Scheer as the mayor (originally played by David Marguiles), the male ESP volunteer (originally played by Steven Tash), and others

2013

January (His Girl Friday)
His Girl Friday by Charles Lederer, based on the play The Front Page by Ben Hecht and Charles MacArthur

Guest director: Fred Savage
Cast
Jason Bateman as Walter Burns (originally played by Cary Grant)
Anne Hathaway as Hildy Johnson (originally played by Rosalind Russell)
Adam Scott as Bruce Baldwin (originally played by Ralph Bellamy)
Paul Scheer as Sheriff Hartwell (originally played by Gene Lockhart)
Nick Kroll as the Mayor (originally played by Clarence Kolb)
Fred Willard as Earl Williams (originally played by John Qualen)
Mae Whitman as Mollie Malloy (originally played by Helen Mack)
Jason Mantzoukas as Eggelhoffer (originally played by Edwin Maxwell)

February (Glengarry Glen Ross)
Glengarry Glen Ross by David Mamet, based on the play by Mamet.  Reitman assembled a cast of women to read the all-male script.

Cast
Robin Wright as Richard Roma (originally played by Al Pacino)
Catherine O'Hara as Shelley Levene (originally played by Jack Lemmon)
Maria Bello as Dave Moss (originally played by Ed Harris)
Melanie Lynskey as George Aaronow (originally played by Alan Arkin)
Mae Whitman as John Williamson (originally played by Kevin Spacey)
Carla Gugino as Blake (originally played by Alec Baldwin)

March (The Usual Suspects)
The Usual Suspects by Christopher McQuarrie

Cast
Kevin Pollak as Dean Keaton (originally played by Gabriel Byrne; Pollak played Hockney in the original film)
Michael C. Hall as Verbal Kint (originally played by Kevin Spacey)
Chi McBride as Special Agent Dave Kujan (originally played by Chazz Palminteri)
Adam Brody as Michael McManus (originally played by Stephen Baldwin)
Mark Duplass as Todd Hockney (originally played by Kevin Pollak)
Nick Kroll as Fred Fenster (originally played by Benicio del Toro)
Mae Whitman as Kobayashi (originally played by Pete Postlethwaite) and Edie (originally played by Suzy Amis)
Jason Mantzoukas as Special Agent Jack Baer (originally played by Giancarlo Esposito)

July (Breaking Bads pilot episode)
The pilot of Breaking Bad by Vince Gilligan.  This was the first television episode performed at the readings.

Cast
Rainn Wilson as Walter White (originally played by Bryan Cranston)
Mae Whitman as Jesse Pinkman (originally played by Aaron Paul)
Annie Mumolo as Skyler White (originally played by Anna Gunn)
Chi McBride as Hank Schrader (originally played by Dean Norris)
Ellie Kemper as Marie Schrader (originally played by Betsy Brandt)
Paul Rust as Walter White, Jr. (originally played by RJ Mitte)

September (Boogie Nights)
Boogie Nights by Paul Thomas Anderson at the Toronto International Film Festival

Cast
Jesse Eisenberg as Dirk Diggler (originally played by Mark Wahlberg)
Josh Brolin as Jack Horner (originally played by Burt Reynolds)
Dakota Fanning as Rollergirl (originally played by Heather Graham)
Olivia Wilde as Amber Waves (originally played by Julianne Moore)
Jason Sudeikis as Buck Swope (originally played by Don Cheadle)
Dane Cook as Reed Rothchild (originally played by John C. Reilly) and Maurice Rodriguez (originally played by Luis Guzmán)
Marc-André Grondin as Scotty J (originally played by Philip Seymour Hoffman)
Jarod Einsohn as Todd Parker (originally played by Thomas Jane)
Scott Thompson as The Colonel (originally played by Robert Ridgely)
Jordan Hayes as Jessie St. Vincent (originally played by Melora Walters)

October (Boogie Nights)
Boogie Nights by Paul Thomas Anderson

Cast
Taylor Lautner as Dirk Diggler (originally played by Mark Wahlberg)
Don Johnson as Jack Horner (originally played by Burt Reynolds)
Mae Whitman as Rollergirl (originally played by Heather Graham)
Judy Greer as Amber Waves (originally played by Julianne Moore) and Dirk's mother (originally played by Joanna Gleason)
Jim Rash as Buck Swope (originally played by Don Cheadle) and Little Bill Thompson (originally played by William H. Macy)
Nick Kroll as Reed Rothchild (originally played by John C. Reilly), Maurice Rodriguez (originally played by Luis Guzmán), Floyd Gondolli (originally played by Philip Baker Hall), and Rahad Jackson (originally played by Alfred Molina)
Nat Faxon as Scotty J (originally played by Philip Seymour Hoffman)
Jarod Einsohn as Todd Parker (originally played by Thomas Jane)
Kevin Pollak as The Colonel (originally played by Robert Ridgely)
Jurnee Smollett as Jessie St. Vincent (originally played by Melora Walters) and Becky Barnett (originally played by Nicole Ari Parker)

November (Tootsie)
Tootsie by Larry Gelbart and Murray Schisgal

Guest director: David Wain
Cast
Nick Kroll as Michael Dorsey/Dorothy Michaels (originally played by Dustin Hoffman)
Hannah Simone as Julie (originally played by Jessica Lange)
Michaela Watkins as Sandy (originally played by Teri Garr)
Thomas Lennon as Jeff (originally played by Bill Murray)
Rob Huebel as George (originally played by Sydney Pollack)
Ken Marino as Ron (originally played by Dabney Coleman)
Fred Melamed as John Van Horn (originally played by George Gaynes)
Zandy Hartig as April (originally played by Geena Davis)

December (Raising Arizona)
Raising Arizona by the Coen brothers

Guest director: Patton Oswalt
Cast
Timothy Olyphant as H.I. McDunnough (originally played by Nicolas Cage)
Amy Poehler as Edwina McDunnough (originally played by Holly Hunter)
Jeff Garlin as Nathan Arizona (originally played by Trey Wilson)
Keegan-Michael Key as Gale Snoats (originally played by John Goodman)
Jordan Peele as Evelle Snoats (originally played by William Forsythe)
Michael McKean as Glen (originally played by Sam McMurray)
Rachael Harris as Dot (originally played by Frances McDormand)
Ron Perlman as Lenny Smalls (originally played by Randall "Tex" Cobb)
Andy Daly as various characters

2014

January (American Pie)
American Pie by Adam Herz. Reitman gender-swapped the cast, with women playing the male roles and men playing the female roles.

Cast
Ari Graynor as Jim (originally played by Jason Biggs)
Sarah Burns as Oz (originally played by Chris Klein)
Olivia Wilde as Kevin (originally played by Thomas Ian Nicholas)
Krysten Ritter as Finch (originally played by Eddie Kaye Thomas)
Mike White as Michelle (originally played by Alyson Hannigan)
Topher Grace as Vicky (originally played by Tara Reid)
Anna Kendrick as Stifler (originally played by Seann William Scott)
John Cho as Heather (originally played by Mena Suvari; Cho played John, MILF Guy #2 in the original film)
Michael Sheen as Nadia (originally played by Shannon Elizabeth) and Stifler's mom (originally played by Jennifer Coolidge)
Sharon Stone as Jim's dad (originally played by Eugene Levy)

February (Pulp Fiction)
Pulp Fiction by Quentin Tarantino

Guest director: Evan Goldberg
Cast
Joseph Gordon-Levitt as Vincent Vega (originally played by John Travolta)
Jordan Peele as Jules Winnfield (originally played by Samuel L. Jackson)
Lizzy Caplan as Mia Wallace (originally played by Uma Thurman) and Honey Bunny (originally played by Amanda Plummer)
Jonah Hill as Butch Coolidge (originally played by Bruce Willis) and Pumpkin (originally played by Tim Roth)
Michael Chiklis as The Wolf (originally played by Harvey Keitel), Captain Koons (originally played by Christopher Walken), and Brett (originally played by Frank Whaley)
Rebecca Romijn as Fabienne (originally played by Maria de Medeiros) and Esmarelda Villalobos (originally played by Angela Jones)
Wendell Pierce as Marsellus Wallace (originally played by Ving Rhames)
Seth Rogen as Lance (originally played by Eric Stoltz), Maynard (originally played by Duane Whitaker), and Jimmy Dimmick (originally played by Quentin Tarantino)

March (Groundhog Day)
Groundhog Day by Danny Rubin and Harold Ramis.  Reitman chose this reading as a tribute to Harold Ramis, who died the previous month.  He also chose an earlier draft of the screenplay rather than the final shooting script.

Cast
 Jason Bateman as Phil Connors (originally played by Bill Murray)
 Elizabeth Reaser as Rita (originally played by Andie MacDowell)
 Jeff Ross as Larry (originally played by Chris Elliott) and others
 Stephen Tobolowsky as Ned Ryerson (originally played by Stephen Tobolowsky)
 Mae Whitman as Nancy (originally played by Marita Geraghty) and others

April

The Graduate
April 17: The Graduate by Calder Willingham and Buck Henry.  Based on the novel by Charles Webb.

Cast
 Sharon Stone as Mrs. Robinson (originally played by Anne Bancroft)
 Jay Baruchel as Benjamin Braddock (originally played by Dustin Hoffman)
 Mae Whitman as Elaine Robinson (originally played by Katharine Ross)
 Paul Scheer as Mr. Braddock (originally played by William Daniels) and others
 Kevin Pollak as Mr. Robinson (originally played by Murray Hamilton) and others
 Tig Notaro as Mrs. Braddock (originally played by Elizabeth Wilson)

The Hateful Eight

April 19, special event: The Hateful Eight by Quentin Tarantino at the United Artists Theater at the Ace Hotel Los Angeles.  Unusually for the series, this script had not been filmed prior to the reading.  After a script leak in January, Tarantino considered dropping the film, but decided to hold a reading of the first draft of this script.

Guest director: Quentin Tarantino
Cast
 Samuel L. Jackson as Major Marquis Warren
 Kurt Russell as John "The Hangman" Ruth
 Amber Tamblyn as Daisy Domergue
 Walton Goggins as Chris Maddox
 Bruce Dern as Confederate General Smithers
 Michael Madsen as John Gage
 Tim Roth as Oswaldo Mobray
 James Parks as O.B.
 Denis Ménochet as Bob
 James Remar as Jody
 Dana Gourrier as Minnie
 Zoë Bell as Six Horse Judy

October (American Beauty)
American Beauty by Alan Ball. All cast members starred in Jason Reitman's 2014 film Men, Women & Children.

Cast
Adam Sandler as Lester Burnham (originally played by Kevin Spacey)
Rosemarie DeWitt as Carolyn Burnham (originally played by Annette Bening) and Barbara Fitts (originally played by Allison Janney)
Kaitlyn Dever as Jane Burnham (originally played by Thora Birch)
Travis Tope as Ricky Fitts (originally played by Wes Bentley)
Olivia Crocicchia as Angela Hayes (originally played by Mena Suvari)
Dean Norris as Colonel Frank Fitts (originally played by Chris Cooper) and others
Phil LaMarr as Buddy Kane (originally played by Peter Gallagher) and Jim Olmeyer (originally played by Scott Bakula) and others

November (Diner)

Diner by Barry Levinson.  All cast members have appeared in a lead or recurring role in the FX show The League.

Cast
 Mark Duplass as Boogie (originally played by Mickey Rourke)
 Nadine Velazquez as Barbara (originally played by Kathryn Dowling)
 Stephen Rannazzisi as Eddie (originally played by Steve Guttenberg)
 Katie Aselton as Beth (originally played by Ellen Barkin)
 Rob Huebel as Billy (originally played by Tim Daly)
 Jason Mantzoukas as Modell (originally played by Paul Reiser)
 Paul Scheer as Shrevie (originally played by Daniel Stern)
 Nick Kroll as Fenwick (originally played by Kevin Bacon)

December (The Empire Strikes Back)

The Empire Strikes Back by Leigh Brackett and Lawrence Kasdan, story by George Lucas.

Cast
 Aaron Paul as Luke Skywalker (originally played by Mark Hamill)
 Elliot Page as Han Solo (originally played by Harrison Ford)
 Jessica Alba as Princess Leia Organa (originally played by Carrie Fisher)
 Dennis Haysbert as Lando Calrissian (originally played by Billy Dee Williams)
 Stephen Merchant as C-3PO (originally played by Anthony Daniels)
 Jason Reitman as R2-D2 (originally played by Kenny Baker), in addition to his usual reading of stage directions
 J. K. Simmons as Darth Vader (originally played by David Prowse and voiced by James Earl Jones)
 Kevin Pollak as Yoda (originally played by Frank Oz) and others
 Rainn Wilson as Chewbacca (originally played by Peter Mayhew)
 Mark Hamill as Obi-Wan Kenobi (originally played by Alec Guinness) and the Emperor (originally played by Clive Revill) (Hamill played Luke in the original film)

2015

January (Goodfellas)

Goodfellas by Nicholas Pileggi and Martin Scorsese.  Based on Wiseguy by Pileggi.

Cast 
 Fred Savage as Henry Hill (originally played by Ray Liotta)
 Eric André as Tommy (originally played by Joe Pesci)
 Laurence Fishburne as Jimmy (originally played by Robert De Niro)
 Michaela Watkins as Karen Hill (originally played by Lorraine Bracco)
 Joe Manganiello as Paul (originally played by Paul Sorvino)
 Mae Whitman as Sandy (originally played by Debi Mazar)
 Dane Cook as Morris (originally played by Chuck Low)

February (Sideways)

Sideways by Alexander Payne and Jim Taylor. Based on the novel by Rex Pickett.

Cast
 Josh Gad as Miles Raymond (originally played by Paul Giamatti)
 Keegan-Michael Key as Jack Cole (originally played by Thomas Haden Church)
 Michaela Watkins as Maya Randall (originally played by Virginia Madsen)
 Lake Bell as Stephanie (originally played by Sandra Oh)
 Catherine Reitman as Victoria (originally played by Jessica Hecht)

March (Dazed and Confused)

Dazed and Confused by Richard Linklater.  Most actors except Travis Tope also played various freshmen.

Cast
 James Van Der Beek as Randall "Pink" Floyd (originally played by Jason London)
 Travis Tope as Mitch Kramer (originally played by Wiley Wiggins)
 Nick Kroll as Ron Slater (originally played by Rory Cochrane), Tony Olson (originally played by Anthony Rapp), and Fred O’Bannion (originally played by Ben Affleck)
 Mae Whitman as David Wooderson (originally played by Matthew McConaughey) and Sabrina Davis (originally played by Christin Hinojosa)
 Eric André as Don Dawson (originally played by Sasha Jenson)
 Michaela Watkins as Jodi Kramer (originally played by Michelle Burke) and Cynthia Dunn (originally played by Marissa Ribisi)
 Catherine Reitman as Kaye Faulkner (originally played by Christine Harnos)
 Jason Mantzoukas as Mike Newhouse (originally played by Adam Goldberg)
 Whitney Cummings as Julie Simms (originally played by Catherine Avril Morris) and Darla Marks (originally played by Parker Posey)
 Paul Scheer as Kevin Pickford (originally played by Shawn Andrews) and Clint Bruno (originally played by Nicky Katt)
 Jonathan Tucker as Benny O'Donnell (originally portrayed by Cole Hauser)

April (Major League)

Major League by David S. Ward

Guest director: Joe Manganiello.  In a departure from Live Read tradition, Manganiello did not read the stage directions, but instead played a character.  He cast sportscaster Rich Eisen as the narrator.

Cast
 Joe Manganiello as Jake Taylor (originally played by Tom Berenger)
 Brian Wilson as Ricky Vaughn (originally played by Charlie Sheen)
 Rob Huebel as Roger Dorn (originally played by Corbin Bernsen)
 Sharon Osbourne as Rachel Phelps (originally played by Margaret Whitton) and Suzanne Dorn (originally played by Stacy Carroll)
 Billy Gardell as Lou Brown (originally played by James Gammon)
 Ming-Na Wen as Lynn Wells (originally played by Rene Russo)
 Robbie Jones as Willie Mays Hayes (originally played by Wesley Snipes)
 Eric Stonestreet as Charlie Donovan (originally played by Charles Cyphers) and Eddie Harris (originally played by Chelcie Ross)
 Sofía Vergara as Pedro Cerrano (originally played by Dennis Haysbert)
 Thomas Lennon as Harry Doyle (originally played by Bob Uecker)

May ("The Wheel" from Mad Men)

The first-season finale of Mad Men, "The Wheel" by Matthew Weiner and Robin Veith.  The reading was held on the same day as the premiere of the series finale and was followed by a screening of that episode.

Cast
 Colin Hanks as Don Draper (originally played by Jon Hamm; Hanks played Father John Gill in three episodes in the show's second season)
 Kaitlyn Dever as Peggy Olson (originally played by Elisabeth Moss)
 Fred Savage as Pete Campbell (originally played by Vincent Kartheiser) and Glen Bishop (originally played by Marten Holden Weiner)
 Mickey Sumner as Betty Draper (originally played by January Jones)
 Ashley Greene as Joan Holloway (originally played by Christina Hendricks), Annie (originally played by Kathrine Boecher) and others
 Brian Klugman as Paul Kinsey (originally played by Michael Gladis)
 Rob Huebel as Ken Cosgrove (originally played by Aaron Staton)
 David Wain as Harry Crane (originally played by Rich Sommer)
 Kevin Pollak as Bertram Cooper (originally played by Robert Morse) and Duck Phillips (originally played by Mark Moses)

June (Fast Times at Ridgemont High)

Fast Times at Ridgemont High by Cameron Crowe based on book Fast Times at Ridgemont High: A True Story by Crowe at the Los Angeles Film Festival

Guest director: Eli Roth

Cast
 Logan Paul as Jeff Spicoli (originally played by Sean Penn)
 Lily Collins as Stacy Hamilton (originally played by Jennifer Jason Leigh)
 Haley Joel Osment as Brad Hamilton (originally played by Judge Reinhold)
 Kumail Nanjiani as Mike Damone (originally played by Robert Romanus)
 Daryl Sabara as Mark "Rat" Ratner (originally played by Brian Backer)
 Lorenza Izzo as Linda Barrett (originally played by Phoebe Cates)
 Courtney Love as Mr. Hand (originally played by Ray Walston)
 Aaron Burns as Charles Jefferson (originally played by Forest Whitaker; Burns is a frequent collaborator of Roth's, both on- and off-camera)
 Nik Keswani as Curtis Spicoli (originally played by Patrick Brennan)

July (The Big Lebowski)

The Big Lebowski by the Coen brothers at the Just for Laughs Comedy Festival in Montreal

Cast
 Michael Fassbender as The Dude (originally played by Jeff Bridges)
 Patton Oswalt as Walter Sobchak (originally played by John Goodman)
 Jennifer Lawrence as Maude Lebowski (originally played by Julianne Moore)
 Olivia Munn as Bunny Lebowski (originally played by Tara Reid)
 Mae Whitman as Donnie (originally played by Steve Buscemi)
 Dennis Quaid as the Big Lebowski (originally played by David Huddleston)
 T.J. Miller as Brandt (originally played by Philip Seymour Hoffman)
 Mike Judge as The Stranger (originally played by Sam Elliott)
 Martin Starr as The Jesus (originally played by John Turturro)

Fassbender, Lawrence, and Munn would all appear in X-Men: Apocalypse.  Miller and Starr appear on the series Silicon Valley, created by Judge.

September (The Princess Bride)

The Princess Bride by William Goldman, based on the novel by Goldman at the 2015 Toronto International Film Festival.

Cast
 Cary Elwes as Westley (Elwes played the role in the original film)
 Rachel McAdams as Buttercup (originally played by Robin Wright) and Valerie (originally played by Carol Kane)
 Patrick Stewart as Prince Humperdinck (originally played by Chris Sarandon)
 Catherine Reitman and Gael García Bernal as Inigo Montoya (originally played by Mandy Patinkin)
 Chris O'Dowd as Count Rugen (originally played by Christopher Guest) and Miracle Max (originally played by Billy Crystal)
 Georges Laraque as Fezzik (originally played by André the Giant)
 Donald Glover as Vezzini (originally played by Wallace Shawn) and The Albino (originally played by Mel Smith)
 Rob Reiner as the Grandfather (originally played by Peter Falk; Reiner directed the original film)
 Gage Munroe as the Grandson (originally played by Fred Savage)

Garcia Bernal was late for the show due to a delayed flight, so Catherine Reitman filled in until he arrived.

October (Ferris Bueller's Day Off)

Ferris Bueller's Day Off by John Hughes

 Fred Savage as Ferris Bueller (originally played by Matthew Broderick)
 Martin Starr as Cameron Frye (originally played by Alan Ruck)
 Catherine Reitman as Sloane Peterson (originally played by Mia Sara)
 Clark Gregg as Rooney (originally played by Jeffrey Jones)
 Mae Whitman as Jeannie Bueller (originally played by Jennifer Grey)
 Michaela Watkins as Grace (originally played by Edie McClurg)
 Richard Speight Jr. as Economics Teacher (originally played by Ben Stein)
 James Van Der Beek as Boy in Police Station (originally played Charlie Sheen)

November (Network)

Network by Paddy Chayefsky

Guest director: Scott Sternberg

 Aaron Sorkin as Howard Beale (originally played by Peter Finch)
 Minnie Driver as Diana Christenson (originally played by Faye Dunaway)
 Tony Goldwyn as Max Schumacher (originally played by William Holden)
 Dermot Mulroney as Frank Hackett (originally played by Robert Duvall)
 Fred Willard as Arthur Jensen (originally played by Ned Beatty)
 Nick Kroll as Nelson Chaney (originally played by Wesley Addy) and Great Ahmet Kahn (originally played by Arthur Burghardt)
 Alex Borstein as Louise Schumacher (originally played by Beatrice Straight)
 Lauryn Whitney as Laureen Hobbs (originally played by Marlene Warfield)
 Chelsey Crisp as Walter C. Amundsen (originally played by Jerome Dempsey)
 Warren Olney as Narrator (originally played by Lee Richardson)

December (True Romance)

True Romance by Quentin Tarantino

 Christian Slater as Clarence Worley (Slater reprised his role from the original film)
 Patricia Arquette as Alabama Whitman (Arquette reprised her role from the original film)
 Mae Whitman as Dick Ritchie (originally played by Michael Rapaport)
 Paul Scheer as Elliot Blitzer (originally played by Bronson Pinchot) and others
 J. K. Simmons as Cliff Worley (originally played by Dennis Hopper) and others
 Jon Favreau as Virgil (originally played by James Gandolfini)
 Keegan-Michael Key as Drexl (originally played by Gary Oldman) and others
 Kevin Pollak as Vincenzo Coccotti (originally played by Christopher Walken), Lee Donowitz (originally played by Saul Rubinek), and others
 Jay Duplass as Detective Dimes (originally played by Chris Penn)
 Mark Duplass as Detective Nicholson (originally played by Tom Sizemore)
 Jason Segel as Floyd (originally played by Brad Pitt)

2016

January (Dr. Strangelove)

Dr. Strangelove by Stanley Kubrick, Terry Southern & Peter George. Based on the novel Red Alert by Peter George.

Guest director: Mark Romanek

 Josh Gad as Captain Lionel Mandrake (originally played by Peter Sellers)
 Catherine O'Hara as President Merkin Muffley (originally played by Peter Sellers)
 Patrick Stewart as Dr. Strangelove (originally played by Peter Sellers)
 Seth Rogen as General Buck Turgidson (originally played by George C. Scott)
 Shia LaBeouf as Brigadier General Jack D. Ripper (originally played by Sterling Hayden)
 Colin Hanks as Colonel Bat Guano (originally played by Keenan Wynn)
 Johnny Knoxville as T.J. "King" Kong (originally played by Slim Pickens)
 P. J. Byrne as Alexei de Sadeski (originally played by Peter Bull)
 Olivia Wilde as Miss Scott (originally played by Tracy Reed)
 Fred Willard as the narrator
 Fiona Apple sang "We'll Meet Again" to close out the reading. She was pied in the face by Johnny Knoxville.

February (The Maltese Falcon)

The Maltese Falcon by John Huston. Based on the novel by Dashiell Hammett.

Guest director: Laurence Fishburne.  LACMA curator and event host Elvis Mitchell read the stage directions.

 Laurence Fishburne as Sam Spade (originally played by Humphrey Bogart)
 Cree Summer as Brigid O'Shaughnessy (originally played by Mary Astor)
 Orlando Jones as Joel Cairo (originally played by Peter Lorre)
 Liza Lapira as Effie Perine (originally played by Lee Patrick)
 Peter Mackenzie as Casper Gutman (originally played by Sydney Greenstreet)
 Spencer Garrett as Det. Tom Polhaus (originally played by Ward Bond)
 Langston Fishburne as Wilmer Cook (originally played by Elisha Cook Jr.)

March (Stand by Me)

Stand by Me by Bruce A. Evans & Raynold Gideon. Based on the novella The Body by Stephen King.  Like the Glengarry Glen Ross reading, the all-male script was read by all women.

Kaitlyn Dever as Gordie (originally played by Wil Wheaton)
Elliot Page as Chris (originally played by River Phoenix; the reading took place before Page came out as transgender)
Molly Ephraim as Teddy (originally played by Corey Feldman)
Charlyne Yi as Vern (originally played by Jerry O'Connell)
Kristen Schaal as Ace (originally played by Kiefer Sutherland)
Collette Wolfe as Charlie (originally played by Gary Riley)
Rosemarie DeWitt as adult Gordie, the narrator (originally played by Richard Dreyfuss)
Sarah Thyre as various characters

April (Thank You For Smoking)

Thank You for Smoking by Jason Reitman.  Based on the novel by Christopher Buckley.  For the first time, Reitman staged a performance of one of his own scripts.

Courtney B. Vance as Nick Naylor (originally played by Aaron Eckhart)
Mae Whitman as Joey Naylor (originally played by Cameron Bright), Jack (originally played by Adam Brody), and other roles
Ashley Greene as Heather Holloway (originally played by Katie Holmes)
Rhea Seehorn as Polly Bailey (originally played by Maria Bello)
Josh Gad as Bobby Jay Bliss (originally played by David Koechner; Patton Oswalt was originally slated to play this role, but was replaced by Gad at the last minute) and other roles
Bill Simmons as Senator Ortolan Finistirre (originally played by William H. Macy)
Tim Allen as the Captain (originally played by Robert Duvall)
Ron Livingston as B.R. (originally played by J. K. Simmons)
Tommy Dewey as Jeff Megall (originally played by Rob Lowe) and other roles

Reitman announced that this reading would be the last of the series.

2018

December (Casablanca)

For the first time since April 2016, Reitman directed another live read, featuring an all-female cast, of Casablanca, by Julius J. Epstein, Philip G. Epstein, and Howard Koch.  The reading was sponsored by Astraea Lesbian Foundation for Justice.

 Elliot Page as Rick Blaine (originally played by Humphrey Bogart; the reading took place before Page came out as transgender)
 Kiersey Clemons as Ilsa Lund (originally played by Ingrid Bergman)
 Olivia Wilde as Victor Laszlo (originally played by Paul Henreid)
 Hannah Gadsby as Captain Louis Renault (originally played by Claude Rains)
 Emily Hampshire as Signor Ugarte (originally played by Peter Lorre)
 Indya Moore as Carl (originally played by S.Z. Sakall)
 Lea DeLaria
 Kate Moennig

2019

March (My Dinner With Andre)

Film Independent Presents, the producers of the Live Read series, resumed again with (what was supposed to be) My Dinner With Andre by Andre Gregory and Wallace Shawn with comedy stars Nick Kroll and John Mulaney. Hosted by Elvis Mitchell, the evening veered into a comedy put-on by Kroll and Mulaney, as the reading was staged with Michael Keaton and Paula Pell doing the main roles from the original script, heavily interrupted by Kroll and Mulaney's Oh, Hello characters Gil Faizon and George St. Geegland, respectively.

 Michael Keaton as Andre (originally played by Andre Gregory)
 Paula Pell as Wally (originally played by Wallace Shawn)
 Nick Kroll as Gil Faizon (reciting "own dialogue")
 John Mulaney as George St. Geegland (reciting "own dialogue")

June (When Harry Met Sally...)

When Harry Met Sally... by Nora Ephron.

Guest director: Randall Park. Park assembled a cast entirely of Asian-American actors.  Film Independent curator and event host Elvis Mitchell read the stage directions.

Steven Yeun as Harry (originally played by Billy Crystal)
Maya Erskine as Sally (originally played by Meg Ryan)
Jimmy O. Yang as Jess (originally played by Bruno Kirby)
Liza Lapira as Marie (originally played by Carrie Fisher)
Jae Suh Park as various characters
Randall Park as various characters 
Performance of It Had to Be You and Our Love Is Here to Stay by singing duo Meg & Dia Frampton.

This was Elvis Mitchell’s final night at the helm of Film Independent's signature screening series, which would continue under the purview of director of events Rachel Bleemer.

October (Singles) 

Singles by Cameron Crowe.

Guest director: James Ponsoldt. Ponsoldt read the stage directions and acted as the host encouraging the audience to "wear their flannel."

A nice treat leading into evening's main event was an email from Crowe, which Ponsoldt read to the audience. "The movie came from a special time in my life," Crowe said. "I'd fallen in love with Seattle, and so many of the soulful members of the community." He went on to acknowledge the late Soundgarden frontman, who has a cameo in the film, saying: "Love live Chris Cornell!"

 Kelly Marie Tran as Janet Livermore (originally played by Bridget Fonda)
Mamoudou Athie as Steve Dunne (originally played by Campbell Scott)
Karen Gillan as Linda Powell (originally played by Kyra Sedgwick)
 Bart Davenport as Cliff Poncier (originally played by Matt Dillon)
Lynn Shelton as Debbie Hunt (originally played by Sheila Kelley)
Jay Duplass as various characters
Kelvin Yu as various characters 
Singer-songwriter Bart Davenport took the stage to perform the Paul Westerberg classics "Dyslexic Heart" and "Waiting for Somebody," two standouts from Singles’ classic alternative-rock-era encapsulating soundtrack "Singles: Original Motion Picture Soundtrack"

2020

February (Breaking Away) 

Breaking Away by Steve Tesich

Guest directors: Michael Angelo Covino and Kyle Marvin, the creative team behind The Climb.

A live string quartet provided musical accompaniment.

Taika Waititi as Moocher (originally played by Jackie Earle Haley)
Dennis Christopher as Dave (originally played by Dennis Christopher)
Michael Angelo Covino as Mike (originally played by Dennis Quaid)
Skyler Gisondo as Cyril (originally played by Daniel Stern)
K Callan as Mom (originally played by Barbara Barrie)
Paul Dooley as Dad (originally played by Paul Dooley)
Gayle Rankin as Katherine (originally played by Robyn Douglass)
Andre Royo as Rod (originally played by Hart Bochner)

March (Eternal Sunshine of the Spotless Mind) 

Eternal Sunshine of the Spotless Mind by Charlie Kaufman from a story by Kaufman, Michel Gondry, and Pierre Bismuth

Guest director: Brett Haley

Tessa Thompson as Clementine Kruczynski (originally played by Kate Winslet)
Martin Starr as Joel Barish (originally played by Jim Carrey)
Kiersey Clemons as Patrick (originally played by Elijah Wood)
Kelly Marie Tran as Mary (originally played by Kirsten Dunst)
Nick Kroll as Stan (originally played by Mark Ruffalo)
Jay Duplass as Dr. Mierzwiak (originally played by Tom Wilkinson)
Bridget Regan as Carrie (originally played by Jane Adams)
Ryan Hunt as Rob (originally played by David Cross)
Singer-songwriter Miya Folick performed selections from Jon Brion's soundtrack as well as a rendition of "Everybody's Got to Learn Sometime," which was covered by Beck for the film.

2021

January (Bringing Up Baby) 

Bringing Up Baby by Dudley Nichols and Hagar Wilde from a story by Wilde

Guest director: Paul Feig

Following the COVID-19 pandemic, Film Independent Presents hosted their first virtual live read event.

Jane Levy as Susan Vance (originally played by Katharine Hepburn)
Skylar Astin as David Huxley (originally played by Cary Grant)
John Clarence Stewart as Major Applegate & Professor LaTouche (originally played by Charles Ruggles and D'Arcy Corrigan)
Alex Newell as Slocum & Ms. Swallow (originally played by Walter Catlett and Virginia Walker)
Mary Steenburgen as Aunt Elizabeth (originally played by May Robson)
Marc Evan Jackson as Mrs. Gogarty, Dr Digby, Joe, Caddy, Doorman, Clerk, Motorcycle Cop, Head Waiter, Delivery Man, Zoo Official, Second Roustabout, First Roustabout, Circus Manager, Mac (originally played by Leona Roberts and additional)
Jessica Rothe as Mr. Gogarty, Elmer, Alexander Peabody (originally played by Barry Fitzgerald, John Kelly and George Irving)

November (Sunset Boulevard and L.A. Story) 

Sunset Boulevard by Billy Wilder, Charles Brackett and D.M. Marshman Jr.

Guest director: Marlee Matlin

Troy Kotsur as Joe Gillis (originally played by William Holden)
Marque Richardson as Voice of Joe Gillis
Marlee Matlin as Norma Desmond (originally played by Gloria Swanson)
Wendie Malick as Voice of Norma Desmond
Daniel Durant as Max Von Mayerling (originally played by Erich von Stroheim)
Rafael Cibrian as Voice of Max Von Mayerling
John Maucere as Artie Green (originally played by Jack Webb)
John Mese as Voice of Artie Green
Shoshannah Stern as Sheldrake (originally played by Fred Clark)
Samira Wiley as Voice of Sheldrake
Michael Spady as Betty Schaefer (originally played by Nancy Olson)
Tia Carrere as Voice of Betty Schaefer
Harry Ford as Narrator/Joe Gillis (originally played by William Holden)
Jon Wolfe Nelson as Narrator

L.A. Story by Steve Martin

Guest director: Marvin Lemus

Gloria Calderon as Harris K. Telemacher (originally played by Steve Martin)
Julissa Calderon as Sara McDowel (originally played by Victoria Tennant)
Melinna Bobadilla as Trudi (originally played by Marilu Henner)
Annie Gonzalez as SanDeE* (originally played by Sarah Jessica Parker)
Sarunus Jackson as Roland Mackey, Freeway Sign (originally played by Richard E. Grant)
Jessica Camacho as Ariel, Morris, Boxer, Maitre’D, Guest, New Weather Man, Harry Zell (originally played by Susan Forristal Sam McMurray, Patrick Stewart, George Plimpton , John Lithgow and additional)
Melinna Bobadill as Miscellaneous Roles

Trivia
 As of April 2020, the following actors have participated in multiple readings:
 Seventeen: Mae Whitman (including all eight of the 2012–13 season)
 Fourteen: Nick Kroll (including the joke My Dinner with Andre reading)
 Eight: Kevin Pollak
 Seven: Paul Scheer
 Six: Jason Mantzoukas, Fred Savage (also directed a reading)
 Five: Rob Huebel, Patton Oswalt (also directed a reading), J. K. Simmons, Catherine Reitman, Michaela Watkins, Olivia Wilde
 Four: Seth Rogen, Rainn Wilson
 Three: Kaitlyn Dever, Jay Duplass, Mark Duplass, Laurence Fishburne (directed one of the readings in which he played a character), Josh Gad, Mindy Kaling, Keegan-Michael Key, Chi McBride, Martin Starr, James Van Der Beek, Fred Willard, Collette Wolfe, Elliot Page
 Two: Eric André, Jason Bateman, Michael Chiklis, Kiersey Clemons, Dane Cook, Rosemarie DeWitt, Jarod Einsohn (played the same character in two readings of the same film), Cary Elwes (played different characters in two readings of the same film), Ashley Greene, Colin Hanks, Christina Hendricks, Phil LaMarr, Liza Lapira, Thomas Lennon, Joe Manganiello (directed one of the readings in which he played a character), Stephen Merchant, Olivia Munn, Catherine O'Hara, Aaron Paul, Jordan Peele, Rob Reiner (played the same character in two readings of the same film), Paul Rudd, Paul Rust, Patrick Stewart, Sharon Stone, Jason Sudeikis, Travis Tope, Kelly Marie Tran, David Wain (also directed a reading)
 Bryan Cranston, Dennis Haysbert, Christina Hendricks, Samuel L. Jackson, Phil LaMarr, Michael Madsen, Dean Norris, Aaron Paul, Kevin Pollak, Dennis Quaid, Tim Roth, Fred Savage, J. K. Simmons and Robin Wright all played a character in one of the original films or episodes and have read for a character at a reading of another film or episode. Quentin Tarantino played characters in two of the original films and directed a reading.
 John Cho, Cary Elwes, Mark Hamill, and Kevin Pollak have each read a screenplay they have appeared in, reading roles they hadn't originally played.
 Patricia Arquette, Dennis Christopher, Paul Dooley, Sam Elliott, Cary Elwes, Susan Sarandon, Fred Savage, Christian Slater, and Stephen Tobolowsky have each read a screenplay they have appeared in, reading roles they originally played. Zoë Bell, Bruce Dern, Walton Goggins, Dana Gourrier, Samuel L. Jackson, Michael Madsen, James Parks, Tim Roth, and Kurt Russell all read for characters that they eventually played in The Hateful Eight.
 Four screenplays written by Quentin Tarantino have been read, including the then-unreleased The Hateful Eight.  Two screenplays each by the Coen brothers, Cameron Crowe, John Hughes, and Harold Ramis have been read.

Other events
On March 23, 2014, Jensen Karp assembled a cast to read Space Jam by Leo Benvenuti, Steve Rudnick, Timothy Harris and Herschel Weingrod at the UCB Theatre in Los Angeles.  The event was in many ways a parody of Reitman's series.  While the scripts Reitman chooses are from well-received and occasionally Academy Award-winning films, Space Jam is a children's film that received, at best, mixed reviews.  In addition, LACMA's Bing Theater is a large auditorium, while the UCB Theatre is a small comedy club.  The cast included:

 Blake Griffin as Michael Jordan
 Seth Green as Bugs Bunny (originally voiced by Billy West)
 Nick Kroll as Daffy Duck (originally voiced by Dee Bradley Baker) and Bill Murray
 Danielle Fishel as Lola Bunny (originally voiced by Kath Soucie), Juanita Jordan (originally played by Theresa Randle), Nick Van Exel and others
 Ralph Garman as Porky Pig (originally voiced by Bob Bergen), Yosemite Sam (originally voiced by Bill Farmer), Sylvester (originally voiced by Bill Farmer), Foghorn Leghorn (originally voiced by Bill Farmer), Marvin the Martian (originally voiced by Bob Bergen) and others
 Paul Scheer as Stan Podolak (originally played by Wayne Knight)
 DeAndre Jordan as Charles Barkley and Mr. Swackhammer (originally voiced by Danny DeVito)
 Jerrod Carmichael as Muggsy Bogues, Marcus Jordan (originally played by Eric Gordon), James Jordan Sr. (originally played by Thom Barry) and others
 Ben Schwartz as Zilch, an amalgamation of all of the Nerdlucks/Monstars

References

External links
Film Independent at LACMA
Jason Reitman's Twitter

2011 establishments in California
2016 disestablishments in California
Los Angeles County Museum of Art
Theatre in Los Angeles